Lightnin' Hopkins Strums the Blues is an album by blues musician Lightnin' Hopkins featuring tracks recorded between 1946 and 1948 which were originally released as 10-inch 78rpm records on the Aladdin label. The album was one of the first 12-inch LP collections of Lightnin' Hopkins material to be released. In 1991 a double CD collection of The Complete Aladdin Recordings was released containing all of the recordings Hopkins made for the label.

Track listing
All compositions by Sam "Lightnin'" Hopkins except where noted
 "Katie May" –	3:00
 "My California" – 2:30
 "Honey-Babe" (Max Steiner, Paul Francis Webster) – 2:30
 "Short Haired Woman" – 2:25
 "Little Mama Blues" aka "Big Mama Jump" – 2:40
 "Shotgun" aka "Shotgun Blues" – 2:36
 "Rollin' and Rollin'" aka "Rollin' Blues" – 2:40
 "See See Rider" (Ma Rainey) – 2:35
 "So Long" – 2:40
 "Mistreated" aka "Mistreated Blues" – 2:35
Recorded at Radio Recorders in Los Angeles on November 9, 1946 (track 1) and August 15, 1947 (tracks 4 & 5) and at Commercial Studios in Houston on February 25, 1948 (tracks 2, 3 & 6–10)

Personnel
Lightnin' Hopkins – guitar, vocals
Wilson "Thunder" Smith – piano (track 1)

References

1958 albums
Lightnin' Hopkins albums
Aladdin Records albums